Azamat Aleksandrovich Tomayev (born 21 March 1991) is a Russian football player. He plays for FC Alania-2 Vladikavkaz.

Club career
He made his debut in the Russian Football National League for FC Alania Vladikavkaz on 15 August 2021 in a game against FC Spartak-2 Moscow.

References

External links
 
 
 Profile by Russian Football National League

1991 births
Sportspeople from Vladikavkaz
Living people
Russian footballers
Association football goalkeepers
FC Spartak Vladikavkaz players
FC Khimik-Arsenal players
FC TSK Simferopol players
Russian First League players
Russian Second League players
Crimean Premier League players